The 2000-watt society is an environmental vision, first introduced in 1998 by the Swiss Federal Institute of Technology in Zürich (ETH Zurich), which pictures the average First World citizen reducing their overall average primary energy usage rate to no more than 2,000 watts (i.e. 2 kWh per hour or 48 kWh per day) by the year 2050, without lowering their standard of living.

The concept addresses not only personal or household energy use, but the total for the whole society, including embodied energy, divided by the population.

Two thousand watts is approximately the current world average rate of total primary energy use. This compared, in 2008, to averages of around 6,000 watts in western Europe, 12,000 watts in the United States, 1,500 watts in China, 1,000 watts in India, 500 watts in South Africa and only 300 watts in Bangladesh. Switzerland itself, then using an average of around 5,000 watts, was last a 2000-watt society in the 1960s.

It is further envisaged that the use of carbon-based fuels would be ultimately cut to no more than 500 watts per person within 50 to 100 years.

The vision was developed in response to concerns about climate change, energy security, and the future availability of energy supplies. It is supported by the Swiss Federal Office of Energy, the Association of Swiss Architects and Engineers, and other bodies.

Current energy use

Breakdown of average energy consumption of 5.1 kW by a Swiss person as of July 2008:
1500 watts for living and office space (this includes heat and hot water)
1100 watts for food and consumer discretionary (including transportation of these to the point of sale)
600 watts for electricity
500 watts for automobile travel
250 watts for air travel
150 watts for public transportation
900 watts for public infrastructure

Implications
Researchers in Switzerland believe that this vision is achievable, despite a projected 65% increase in economic growth by 2050, by using new low-carbon technologies and techniques.

It is envisaged that achieving the aim of a 2000-watt society will require, amongst other measures, a complete reinvestment in the country's capital assets; refurbishment of the nation's building stock to bring it up to low-energy building standards; significant improvements in the efficiency of road transport, aviation and energy-intensive material use; the possible introduction of high-speed maglev trains; the use of renewable energy sources, district heating, microgeneration and related technologies; and a refocusing of research into new priority areas.

As a result of the intensified research and development effort required, it is hoped that Switzerland will become a leader in the technologies involved. Indeed, the idea has a great deal of government backing, due to fears about climate change.

Basel pilot region
Launched in 2001 and located in the metropolitan area of Basel, 'Pilot Region Basel'  aims to  develop and commercialise some of the technologies involved. The pilot is a partnership between industry, universities, research institutes and the authorities, coordinated by Novatlantis. Participation is not restricted to locally based organisations. The city of Zurich joined the project in 2005 and the canton of Geneva declared its interest in 2008.

Within the pilot region, the projects in progress include demonstration buildings constructed to MINERGIE or Passivhaus standards, electricity generation from renewable energy sources, and vehicles using natural gas, hydrogen and biogas. The aim is to put research into practice, seek continuous improvements, and to communicate progress to all interested parties, including the public.

Fribourg smart living building 
The Smart Living Lab based in Fribourg is a joint research centre of EPFL, the School of Engineering and Architecture of Fribourg and the University of Fribourg. Together, they designed the smart living building, which will be both a sustainable structure and an evolving building and whose construction starts in 2022.  It will house the activities of some 130 researchers, offering laboratories, offices, conference rooms and some experimental dwellings. In this multiple-use context, the building will become an experimental field of studies in itself, and aims to find solutions to energy consumption and the greenhouse gas emissions that it generates.

This construction is the group's first case study, and research projects have been established to help it meet the lab's ambitious goals: limiting its consumption and emissions to the values set for 2050 by the 2000-watt society vision, while considering the whole life cycle of its components.

See also

 Avoiding Dangerous Climate Change
 Carbon footprint
 Climate Change Act 2008
 Energy conservation
 Energy policy
 Low-carbon economy
 Making Sweden an Oil-Free Society, an official report
 One Watt Initiative
 Paris Agreement
 Peak oil
 Sustainable development
 World energy resources and consumption

Notes and references

External links
Novatlantis: Smart 2000-Watt-Sites

The Zurich partner region (City of Zurich)
The realities of implementing the 2,000 Watt society
Energy from the perspective of sustainable development: the 2000 Watt society

Steps towards a sustainable development. A white book for R & D of energy-efficient technologies; Jochem et al. ETH Zürich, 2004
All info about the 2000 Watt Society (in French)
The 2000 watt area

Energy conservation
Energy policy
Environmental design
Low-carbon economy
Economy of Switzerland
Energy in Switzerland
Transport in Switzerland
1998 introductions